Uzawa's theorem, also known as the steady state growth theorem, is a theorem in economic growth theory concerning the form that technological change can take in the Solow–Swan and Ramsey–Cass–Koopmans growth models. It was first proved by Japanese economist Hirofumi Uzawa.

One general version of the theorem consists of two parts. The first states that, under the normal assumptions of the Solow and Neoclassical models, if (after some time T) capital, investment, consumption, and output are increasing at constant exponential rates, these rates must be equivalent.

Uzawa's theorem demonstrates a significant limitation of the commonly used Neoclassical and Solow models. Imposing the assumption of balanced growth within such models requires that technological change be labor-augmenting. By contraposition, any production function for which it is not possible to represent the effect of technology as a scalar on labor cannot produce a balanced growth path.

Statement 
Throughout this page, a dot over a variable will denote its derivative with respect to time (i.e. ). Also, the growth rate of a variable  will be denoted .

Uzawa's theorem 

(The following version is found in Acemoglu (2009) and adapted from Schlicht (2006))

The growth in capital at time t is given by

Then 

1. ; and

2.

Sketch of proof

Lemma 1
For any constant , .

Proof: Observe that for any , . Therefore,
.

Proof of theorem
We first show that the growth rate of investment  must equal the growth rate of capital  (i.e. ) 

The resource constraint at time  implies 

Therefore, the previous equation implies

for all . Therefore,  and thus
.
From national income accounting for a closed economy, final goods in the economy must either be consumed or invested, thus for all 

Differentiating with respect to time yields

Dividing both sides by  yields

By Lemma 1, it implies that 

Similarly, . Therefore, .                                                                                                                                                   

Next we show that for any , the production function can be represented as one with labor-augmenting technology.

The production function at time  is 

Note that  because (refer to solution to differential equations for proof of this step). Thus, the above equation can be rewritten as
 
For any , define 

and

Combining the two equations yields 
 for any .
By construction,  is also homogeneous of degree one in its two arguments.

.

References

Macroeconomics
Economics theorems
Technological change